Lincoln County Middle School may refer to:

 Lincoln County Middle School (Lincolnton, Georgia), Lincolnton, Georgia
 Lincoln County Middle School (Kentucky), Stanford, Kentucky